Thitarodes varians is a species of moth of the family Hepialidae. It was described by Staudinger in 1896, and is known from the Tibet Autonomous Region in China.

References

External links
Hepialidae genera

Moths described in 1896
Hepialidae